Arlette Poirier (11 June 1926 – 30 May 2012) was a French actress.

Filmography

Bibliography
 Hayward, Susan. French Costume Drama of the 1950s: Fashioning Politics in Film. Intellect Books, 2010.

References

External links

2012 deaths
French film actresses
Actresses from Paris
1926 births
20th-century French actresses
French National Academy of Dramatic Arts alumni